The Archbishop of Melbourne is the diocesan bishop of the Anglican Diocese of Melbourne, Australia, and ex officio metropolitan bishop of the ecclesiastical Province of Melbourne.

List of Bishops and Archbishops of Melbourne
References

External links

 – official site

 
Lists of Anglican bishops and archbishops
Anglican bishops of Melbourne